The gourde or goud is the currency of Haiti. Its ISO 4217 code is HTG and it is divided into 100 centimes (French) or santim (Creole).

The word "gourde" is a French cognate for the Spanish term "gordo", from the "pesos gordos" (also known in English as "hard" pieces of eight, and in French as "piastres fortes espagnoles") in which colonial-era contracts within the Spanish sphere of influence were often denominated.

First gourde, 1813-1870 
The first gourde was introduced in 1813 and replaced the livre at a rate of G 1 = 8 livres and 5 sous.

Coins 
The first issues of coins were silver pieces of 6, 12, and 25 centimes. In 1827, 50c and 100c coins were introduced, followed by 1c and 2c in 1828. In 1846 and 1850, c coins were issued as well as 6c coins. In 1863, bronze coins, produced by the Heaton mint of Birmingham, were issued. These were in denominations of 5c, 10c and 20c and were the last coins of the first gourde.

Banknotes 
The governments of Haiti issued paper money in denominations of G 1, G 2, G 5, G 10, G 20, G 25, G 50, G 100, G 500, and G 1,000.

Second gourde, 1870-1872 
In 1870 the gourde was revalued at a rate of ten to one. Only banknotes were issued for this second gourde, with the government issuing notes of G 10 and G 25.

Third gourde, 1872- 
In 1872, the gourde was again revalued, this time at a rate of three hundred to one. In the early years of this third gourde, only banknotes were being issued and the name piastre was sometimes used instead of gourde, especially on a banknote issue dated 1875. In 1881, the gourde was linked to the French franc at F 5 = G 1 and coin production recommenced.

The peg to the franc did not last, however. In 1912, the gourde was pegged to the US dollar at a value of G 5 to US$1 - although this peg was also abandoned in 1989, and the currency now floats. Due to the old link, G 5 is often referred to as a "Haitian dollar" and 5c is called a "Haitian penny". Indeed, in many places, prices are given not in gourdes, but rather in "Haitian dollars", which must be multiplied by five to convert to gourdes.

Coins 

The 1881 issue of coins consisted of denominations of 1c, 2c, 10c, 20c, and 50c and G 1. 5c coins were added in 1889. Production of the 1c and 2c and G 1 pieces ceased in the mid-1890s, whilst coin production ceased entirely from 1908 until 1949, when 5c and 10c coins were again minted. These were followed by 20c pieces in 1956, 50c in 1972 and G 1 and G 5 in 1995.

Coins currently in circulation are:

 50c
 G 1
 G 5

Banknotes 

In 1875, banknotes were issued by the National Bank of Haiti in denominations of 25c, 1 and 5 piastres (equal to the gourde). Following this, banknotes were issued in denominations ranging from 10c to G 5 by the various Haitian governments until 1916, when the National Bank of the Republic of Haiti (BNRH) began issuing notes. In 1920, G 1, G 2, G 5, G 10 and G 20 notes were issued, with G 50 and G 100 added in 1925. In the 1970s, G 25, G 250, and G 500 notes were introduced. In 1979, the Bank of the Republic of Haiti replaced the BNRH as the paper money issuing body. A 1,000 gourde note was introduced in 1999, to commemorate the 250th anniversary of the founding of Port-au-Prince. A G 20 note was released into circulation in 2001, both as a commemorative (to celebrate the bicentennial of the Constitution of Toussaint L'Ouverture) and as a regular issue. In 2004, the Bank of the Republic of Haiti issued a series of notes to commemorate the bicentennial of Haiti.

Banknotes currently in circulation are:
 G 10
 G 25
 G 50
 G 100
 G 250
 G 500
 G 1,000

Biccentenial of the Independence (1804-2004) series 

Note: The G 1, G 2, G 5, G 20 notes are no longer produced and may no longer be in circulation.

See also 
 Central banks and currencies of the Caribbean
 Economy of Haiti

References

External links 
 Facsimiles of Haitian banknotes
 Coins of Haiti 

Currencies of Haiti
1813 introductions